Lutovinovka is the name of several rural localities in Russia and Ukraine:
Lutovinovka, Bryansk Oblast, a village in Vladimirovsky Selsoviet of Rognedinsky District of Bryansk Oblast
Lutovinovka, Lipetsk Oblast, a village in Vasilyevsky Selsoviet of Izmalkovsky District of Lipetsk Oblast
Lutovinovka, Voronezh Oblast, a village in Timiryazevskoye Rural Settlement of Novousmansky District of Voronezh Oblast
Lutovynivka, a village in the Kozelshchynskyi Raion (district), Poltava Oblast (province) of central Ukraine